Dörtdivan District is a district of the Bolu Province of Turkey. Its seat is the town of Dörtdivan. Its area is 634 km2, and its population is 6,540 (2021).

Composition
There is one municipality in Dörtdivan District:
 Dörtdivan

There are 24 villages in Dörtdivan District:

 Adaköy
 Aşağıdüğer
 Aşağısayık
 Bünüş
 Cemaller
 Çalköy
 Çardak
 Çetikören
 Doğancılar
 Dülger
 Göbüler
 Gücükler
 Kılıçlar
 Kuruca
 Ortaköy
 Ömerpaşalar
 Seyitaliler
 Sorkun
 Süleler
 Yağbaşlar
 Yalacık
 Yayalar
 Yukarıdüğer
 Yukarısayık

References

Districts of Bolu Province